The 2009 AFL Under-18 Championships was the 2009 series of the AFL Under 18 Championships, a state and territory-based Australian rules football competition which showcases the best junior footballers in Australia, primarily with the aim for them to be drafted into the Australian Football League.

This year's competition was played with just one division compared to two from previous years. The competing teams will be Victoria (split into separate Country and Metropolitan teams), South Australia, Western Australia, Northern Territory, a combined New South Wales and Australian Capital Territory team, Tasmania and Queensland. Each team played five games, with teams playing each team from their division from last year plus two from the other division.

Fixture

LADDER

Division 1 Table

Division 1 Champions: Western Australia

Larke Medallists(Best in Division One): David Swallow(WA) and Andrew Hooper(Vic Country)

Division 2 Champions: NSW/ACT

Harrison Medallists(Best in Division 2): Dylan McNeil(NSW/ACT)

2009 AFL Under-18 All-Australian team
The 2009 Under-18 All-Australian team was announced following the conclusion of the 2009 AFL Under 18 Championships on 4 July 2009. The sponsored name of the squad is the 2009 NAB AFL Under-18 All-Australian team, due to sponsorship arrangements with the National Australia Bank (NAB). The team was selected by a panel which was chaired by the AFL national talent manager Kevin Sheehan, and consisted of Alan McConnell and Jason McCartney from the AFL, as well as recruiters Matt Rendell, Bryce Lewis, Graham Hadley and Francis Jackson. The championship-winning Western Australia earned the most selections, with nine of the 22 selections, as well as the coach position in the team. Both the Larke Medallists, David Swallow (WA) and Andrew Hooper (Victoria Country), and the Hunter-Harrison Medallist, Dylan McNeil (NSW/ACT), were selected for the squad. Seventeen of the 22 players in the side were eligible for the 2009 AFL Draft, with nine ultimately selected in the first or priority rounds.

References

External links
 Official AFL Under 18 Championships website
 

Afl Under 18 Championships, 2009
Australian rules football competitions
Australian rules football competition seasons
Australian rules interstate football